Široka planina (Serbian Cyrillic: Широка планина) is a mountain in southern Serbia, near the Macedonian border. The nearest town is Trgovište. Its highest peak Kopljača has an elevation of 1,345 meters above sea level.

References

Mountains of Serbia